Wat Sitaram is a Thai monastery in Bangkok, located on the Damrong Rak Road near Khlong Maha Nak canal between Wat Saket and Bobae Market, considered to be the temple that is closest to Wat Saket, or temple of Golden Mount.

Description

It is a civil temple, formerly name was Wat Khok Mu (วัดคอกหมู, "pigsty temple"). It was told that during King Rama II's reign in early Rattanakosin period Chao Krom Yim (เจ้ากรมยิ้ม), who was a Mon (Peguan) persuaded the Chinese who mostly were pig raisers in the area to build a temple called Wat Khok Mu.

Later Vajirananavarorasa, supreme patriarch at that time has changed its name to Wat Sitaram. It derived from conversion of Pali language, from  a word of Yim (the temple founder's name), and a word of aram (the temple, or monastery), ubosot (ordination hall) of the temple has Chinese styled rooftop covered by Thai styled tiles. The gables are decorated with floral design stuccos and Chinese glazed ceramics.

References

Pom Prap Sattru Phai district
Saket
Thai Theravada Buddhist temples and monasteries
Registered ancient monuments in Bangkok